Varun Mathur (born 22 January 1998), is an Indian professional footballer who plays as a forward for I-League club Kenkre.

Club career

Earlier career
Born in Mumbai, Maharashtra, Mathur began his career with the Kenkre youth team. He then moved with his family to Coimbatore, Tamil Nadu where he played for his school's football team. He moved back to Mumbai at the age of 16 and participated in a trial with DSK Shivajians. He soon joined the club's under-16 side before gaining an opportunity to move to Germany and join the youth team at SB/DJK Rosenheim.

He stayed in Germany for a year before moving back to India to join FC Goa. He was part of the club's reserves side which participated in the I-League 2nd Division.

Chennai City
In 2020, Mathur joined I-League club Chennai City. He made his professional debut for the club on 16 February 2020 against TRAU, starting in a 0–0 draw.

Kenkre
In October September 2021, Mathur signed for Kenkre ahead of the I-League Qualifiers. Though the team missed out on promotion to the I-League, they eventually replaced Chennai City after they failed to comply with club licensing regulations.

On 4 March 2022, he made his first appearance for the club against Real Kashmir, in a 1–1 draw. The club finished in bottom after the phrase-1 and placed in relegation stage, achieved only 12 points and relegated to the 2022–23 I-League 2nd Division. They later participated in Baji Raut Cup in Odisha, but were bowed out out after defeat to Churchill Brothers in semi-final.

Career statistics

Club

See also
 List of Indian football players in foreign leagues

References

External links
 Varun Mathur at the All India Football Federation
 Varun Mathur at NCSA (archived on 14 November 2022)

1998 births
Living people
Footballers from Mumbai
Indian footballers
Association football midfielders
FC Goa players
Chennai City FC players
I-League 2nd Division players
I-League players
Indian expatriate footballers
Expatriate footballers in Germany
DSK Shivajians FC players